Angelos was a Greek noble lineage which gave rise to three Byzantine emperors who ruled between 1185 and 1204.

Angelos may also refer to:

Notable people with the family name Angelos
Constantine Angelos ( 1093–1166), Byzantine admiral
Andronikos Doukas Angelos ( 1133 – before 1185), Byzantine military leader
Alexios III Angelos ( 1153–1211), Byzantine emperor
Isaac II Angelos (1156–1204), Byzantine emperor
Alexios IV Angelos (1182–1204), Byzantine emperor
John I Doukas of Thessaly ( 1240–1289), ruler of Thessaly, also known as John Angelos
Andronikos Angelos Palaiologos ( 1282–1328), Byzantine nobleman
Alexios Angelos Philanthropenos (fl. 1373–1390), Byzantine nobleman
Peter Angelos (born 1929), American trial lawyer

Notable people with the given name Angelos
Angelos Akotantos, 15th-century Byzantine-Cretan icon-painter and hagiographer 
Angelos Anastasiadis (born 1953), Greek football head coach
Angelos Basinas (born 1976), Greek footballer
Angelos Charisteas (born 1980), retired Greek footballer
Angelos Pavlakakis (born 1976), Greek sprinter
Angelos Sikelianos (1884–1951), Greek poet
Angelos Terzakis (1907–1979), Greek writer
Angelos Chanti (born 1989), Greek footballer
Angelos Vlachopoulos (born 1991), Greek water polo player

Other
Angelo, a male name
Angelos (mythology), a deity in Greek mythology, possibly a daughter of Zeus and Hera
Angelos, alternate name for the 1982 Greek film Angel

See also
Angelo (disambiguation)
Angelus (disambiguation)

Greek masculine given names